The Governor of Awdal is the chief executive of the Somaliland region of Awdal, leading the region's executive branch. Governors of the regions is appointed to the office by the Somaliland president. The current governor of Awdal is Mohammed Ahmed Alin.

List of Governers

See also
Awdal
Politics of Somaliland

References

External links

Governors of Awdal